The 2019 IWF World Cup in weightlifting was held in Fuzhou, China from 23 to 27 February 2019. It was also a qualification event for the 2020 Summer Olympics in Tokyo.

There was 1 men's world record, 8 women's world records, and 6 junior world records set during the competition.

Medal overview

Men

Women

References 

IWF World Cup
2019 in weightlifting
IWF World Cup
International weightlifting competitions hosted by China
IWF World Cup
Weightlifting at the 2020 Summer Olympics
Sport in Fuzhou